Kim Yarbrough Green (born 1955) is an American virologist. She is chief of the caliciviruses section in the laboratory of infectious diseases at the National Institute of Allergy and Infectious Diseases. She researches noroviruses in human disease, disease prevention, and control strategies.

Education 
Green earned her Ph.D. from the University of Tennessee Health Science Center in the department of microbiology and immunology. Her dissertation is titled Characterization of rubella virus antigen.

Career 
In 1986, Green joined the laboratory of infectious diseases at the National Institute of Allergy and Infectious Diseases. Green is chief of the caliciviruses section.

She is a member of the American Society for Virology, American Society for Microbiology and the Caliciviridae study group of the International Committee on Taxonomy of Viruses.

Research 
Green's research has focused on the study of viruses associated with gastroenteritis. Her research program has addressed the role of noroviruses in human disease, with an emphasis on the development of prevention and control strategies.

References

External links
 

Living people
Place of birth missing (living people)
National Institutes of Health people
21st-century American biologists
21st-century American women scientists
American medical researchers
Women medical researchers
American women biologists
American virologists
Women virologists
20th-century American biologists
20th-century American women scientists
1955 births
University of Tennessee Health Science Center alumni